Pupilla blandii, common name the Rocky Mountain column, is a species of very small or minute air-breathing land snail, a terrestrial pulmonate gastropod mollusk or micromollusk in the family Pupillidae.

Distribution 
This common species occurs in the United States.

References

 Cockerell, T.D.A. (1888). Mollusca in Colorado. Hardwicke's Science Gossip, 24: 257
 InvertEBase. (2018). Authority files of U.S. and Canadian land and freshwater mollusks developed for the InvertEBase (InvertEBase.org) project

External links 
 Radiocarbon Dating of Gastropod Shells - article with another drawing of the species
 Morse, E. S. (1865). Descriptions of new species of Pupadae. Annals of the Lyceum of Natural History of New York. 8: 207-212
 Ancey, C. F. (1881). Description de coquilles nouvelles. Le Naturaliste. 3 (49): 389-390. Paris
 Pilsbry, H. A. (1914). Shells of Duran, New Mexico. The Nautilus. 28(4): 37-38, plate 2
 Pilsbry, H. A. (1920-1921). Manual of conchology, structural and systematic, with illustrations of the species. Ser. 2, Pulmonata. Vol. 26: Pupillidae (Vertigininae, Pupillinae). pp i-iv, 1-254, pls 1-24. Philadelphia, published by the Conchological Section, Academy of Natural Sciences
 Squyer, H. (1894). List of shells from the vicinity of Mingusville, Montana. The Nautilus, 8(6): 63-65
 Cockerell, T. D. A. (1892). New varieties of American Mollusca. Journal of Conchology. 7: 39.

Pupillidae
Gastropods described in 1865